"Ritmo" (also known as "Ritmo (Bad Boys for Life)") is a song by American group Black Eyed Peas and Colombian singer J Balvin, released by Epic Records on October 11, 2019, as the first single from the soundtrack of the 2020 film Bad Boys for Life. It is also included on the group's eighth studio album Translation.

The song features a prominent sample of the 1993 song "The Rhythm of the Night" by the Italian group Corona (the song is performed by Italian singer Jenny B, the ghost-voice involved in the project). Musician/actress Jennifer Lopez was originally intended to appear on the remix version, but Jaden Smith (in which his father starred in the third film) appeared on the remix instead. The song was performed live at the closing ceremony of the 2019 Southeast Asian Games in the Philippines.

Music video
The official video of the song was released on YouTube on October 11, 2019, on the official Black Eyed Peas channel and received 130 million views in just three weeks. As of September 2022, it has over 1 bilion views. It was directed by Colin Tilley.

Commercial performance
The song debuted at number 100 on the US Billboard Hot 100 and peaked at number 26, staying on the chart for 27 weeks. It became the Black Eyed Peas' 17th Hot 100 entry and their first since "Don't Stop the Party" peaked at number 86 in 2011, as well as their first top 40 entry since "Just Can't Get Enough" peaked at number 3 in 2011. On Billboards Mainstream Top 40 chart, the song peaked at number 8. The song spent 24 weeks at number one on the Hot Latin Songs chart.

Charts

Weekly charts

Year-end charts

All-time charts

Certifications

See also
 List of Airplay 100 number ones of the 2020s
 List of Billboard Argentina Hot 100 top-ten singles in 2019
List of Billboard Hot Latin Songs and Latin Airplay number ones of 2020

References

External links
 

2019 songs
2019 singles
J Balvin songs
Macaronic songs
Number-one singles in Romania
Bad Boys (franchise)
Songs written for films
Songs written by J Balvin
Black Eyed Peas songs
Songs written by apl.de.ap
Songs written by will.i.am
Epic Records singles
Music videos directed by Colin Tilley
Songs written by Keith Harris (record producer)
Songs written by Ann Lee (singer)
Songs written by Giorgio Spagna
Songs written by Pete Glenister